Nian Yun (born 9 October 1982) is a Chinese swimmer and Olympic medalist. She participated at the 1996 Summer Olympics in Atlanta, winning a silver medal in 4 x 100 metre freestyle relay.

References

1982 births
Living people
Chinese female freestyle swimmers
Swimmers from Jiangsu
Olympic swimmers of China
Olympic silver medalists for China
Swimmers at the 1996 Summer Olympics
Medalists at the FINA World Swimming Championships (25 m)
Sportspeople from Yangzhou
Olympic silver medalists in swimming
Nanjing Sport Institute alumni
Medalists at the 1996 Summer Olympics